Australian Apple Review was an Australian computer magazine (ISSN 0816-7184) published by Gareth Powell Pty Ltd and Saturday Magazine Pty Ltd and initially printed by Offset Alpine and then by Ian Liddel Pty Ltd. The first issue was available in newsagents and dealerships in 1984 (36 pages) at the recommended price of $3.00. Its headquarters was in Randwick, New South Wales.

The magazine was published roughly monthly with 10 issues per year. The final issue was Vol 4 No 5 1987. The first editor of the magazine was Graeme Philipson. Later issues were edited by Gene Stephan and Gareth Powell.

The articles in Australian Apple Review catered for beginners to computing, through to highly technical programming techniques, industry updates and resources, with a focus on software, peripherals and computers available from Apple Computer. Articles were written by both full-time magazine staff and freelance contributors, including Paul Zabrs.

References

External links
Complete scanned and OCR'd issues of Australian Apple Review

1984 establishments in Australia
1987 disestablishments in Australia
Computer magazines published in Australia
Monthly magazines published in Australia
Defunct computer magazines
Defunct magazines published in Australia
Home computer magazines
Magazines established in 1984
Magazines disestablished in 1987
Magazines published in Sydney
Macintosh magazines